Yadvi – The Dignified Princess is an Indian English film produced and directed by Jyoti Singh.

The film stars Chandrachur Singh and popular Indian TV actor Vibhu Raghave. Miss India Worldwide 2009 Nikkitasha Marwaha also had a cameo in the film. The film was released theatrically on August 25, 2017.

Story
The film is about a real life princess raised in an extremely wealthy family who ends up losing all her privileges in her middle age. Set in 1940s India, much before the cry for feminist equality caught ground, the princess not only holds her own dignity but raises three daughters.

It showcases the life and times of Maharani Yadhuvansh Kumari, Patiala's Maharaja Bhupinder Singh of Patiala.

The film tells the story of integrity and true grit in face of unexpected adversity. Yadvi, will take you on her journey through the India of Kings and Queens, of Princes and polygyny. Her deep internal strength bolstering her family honour will inspire viewers.

Cast
 Chandrachur Singh as His Highness Maharaja Bhupinder Singh
 Charu Vyas as Her Highness Maharani Vimal Kaur
 Rahul Godara as Yuvraj Govind Singh 
 Jyoti Singh as Yadvi 
 Vibhu Raghave as Prince Billie 
 Namya Saxena as Yadvi
 Gauri Singh as Gauri Singh
 Nikkitasha Marwaha
 Reshaa Sabarawal 
 Mini Pandit
 Ashwarya Singh

Film festivals and awards

Yadvi - The Dignified Princess was screened at multiple film festivals across the world, including Manhattan Film Festival and DC South Asian Film Festival.

 Best Director (Jyoti Singh) at 4th Indian Cine Film Festival, 2016
 Best Music (Anuj Garg) at 4th Indian Cine Film Festival, 2016
 Globe Award at Around Intl. Film Festival, May 2016
 Award of Recognition for Film Feature at Global Film Competition, November 2016
 Best Feature Film: Yadvi (3rd Prize) at Rishikesh Art & Film Festival, 2017
 Gold Award Winner at International Film Festival for Women, Social Issues, and Zero Discrimination
 World Platinum Award at World's Women Award 
 Best Direction at NCISAFF
 Best Screenplay (Gauri Singh) at NCISAFF
 Best Film at NCISAFF
 Best Actress (Jyoti Singh) at NCISAFF
 Best Emerging Female Director (Jyoti Singh) at Dada Saheb Phalake Film Festival
 Award of Excellence, Lead Actress (Jyoti Singh) at Depth of Field International Film Festival   
 Award of Excellence, Lead Actor (Vibhu Raghave) at Depth of Field International Film Festival
 AWARD of Outstanding Excellence, Editing (Vick Krishna) at Depth of Field International Film Festival
 AWARD of Excellence, Original Concept (Gauri Singh) at Depth of Field International Film Festival
 Best Cinematography (Jigme Tenzing), at The People's Film Festival
 Nomination for Best Actress

References

External links
 
 
 

2010s historical drama films
2017 films
Indian historical drama films
2010s English-language films